Ana-Maria Ramos (born June 16, 1976) is an American politician. She is a Democrat representing District 102 in the Texas House of Representatives since 2019. The 102nd district serves parts of the cities of Dallas, Richardson, & Garland.

Political career 

In 2018, Ramos ran against Republican incumbent Linda Koop for the 102nd District seat in the Texas House of Representatives, and won with 52.9% of the vote. She ran for re-election in 2020, and again faced Koop, this time winning 53.9% of the vote.

Ramos currently sits on the Natural Resources committee, as well as the Human Services committee.

Electoral record

Personal life 

Ramos earned a JD from SMU Dedman School of Law and an MBA from Texas Women's University. She currently works as an attorney, and as an Associate Professor at El Centro College.

References 

Living people
People from Richardson, Texas
Politicians from Dallas
Hispanic and Latino American state legislators in Texas
Hispanic and Latino American women in politics
University of Texas at Arlington alumni
Dedman School of Law alumni
Texas Woman's University alumni
Democratic Party members of the Texas House of Representatives
Women state legislators in Texas
21st-century American women politicians
21st-century American politicians
1966 births